Costa Rican Americans are Americans of at least partial Costa Rican descent.

The Costa Rican population in 2018 was 154,784. Costa Ricans are the fourth smallest Latino group in the United States and the smallest Central American population.

Costa Rican populations are prominent in the New York Metropolitan Area, especially in North Central New Jersey (Essex County, New Jersey, Passaic County, New Jersey, Somerset County, New Jersey, and Union County, New Jersey).  Additional areas with significant Costa Rican residents include New York City, Suffolk County, New York, and Fairfield County, Connecticut.  There are also sizable groups of Costa Ricans in the Los Angeles metropolitan area, South Florida metropolitan area, and Lincoln County, North Carolina.

History 

Costa Rican immigration to the United States, as a percentage of total immigration from Central America, has been declining since 1960. In the period from 1960 to 2009, total immigration from Costa Rica to the United States represented only 3 percent of total immigration from Central America over the same period. Lower prices and higher wages in the United States serve as strong motivators for Costa Ricans to emigrate. As with many other groups of immigrants, Costa Ricans send roughly $650 million in remittances every year to support their families in Costa Rica.

The largest communities of Costa Ricans in the United States are in California, Texas, Florida, and the New York metropolitan area, including parts of New Jersey, the state with the highest percentage of individuals identifying as Costa Rican. The town of Bound Brook, New Jersey has the highest percentage of Costa Ricans at 11.82 percent. Reasons for the phenomenon of Costa Rican immigration to New Jersey specifically are unclear, but some, including Costa Rican consulate-general Ana Villalobos and Costa Rican ambassador to the United States Roman Macaya, have posted that this immigration occurs along existing familial ties beginning with the first Costa Rican immigrants to the United States. Former President of Costa Rica Luis Guillermo Solis recognized the special case of Costa Ricans in Bound Brook when he visited the town in 2014 to celebrate Costa Rica's independence while in the United States for a United Nations conference.

Naturalization rates among Costa Ricans have remained fairly steady since 2000. In 2000, 1,895 individuals who identified their country of origin as Costa Rica became naturalized citizens of the United States. In 2017, there were 1,720 individuals of the same category who became naturalized. In the period from 2000 to 2009, 45.7 percent of all Costa Rican immigrants to the United States became naturalized citizens, close to the average for most immigrant groups. In 2000, 1,324 Costa Ricans were admitted to the United States as lawful permanent residents. In 2017, 2,184 individuals of the same category were admitted.

According to reporting from the Washington Post, illegal immigrants do travel along connections set up by businesses looking to take advantage of cheap undocumented labor. For example, The Trump Organization funneled illegal Costa Rican immigrants to Bedminster, New Jersey, where they worked on the company's golf courses in various capacities along with illegal immigrants from other Latin American countries.

 In part to low numbers of Costa Rican immigrants in the United States, so the formation of communities in the U.S. that are uniquely Costa Rican in character is uncommon; most Costa Rican immigrants tend to assimilate. 
 " Historically Costa Rica has been an exception to the trend toward military regimes, violent changes of power and local wars in Third World countries"

Culture 
Costa Rican Americans frequently participate in cultural traditions practiced by other Latin Americans, such as Cinco de Mayo and Mexico's independence, September 15, in addition to their own celebrations. As Costa Rican Americans assimilate into United States society, they leave behind some of their more traditional customs and adopt the practices of American holidays and special events, like the  Fourth of July. As a result, second- and third-generation Americans of Costa Rican descent are generally not familiar with traditional aspects of Costa Rican culture as it is practiced in the country itself. However, in areas where there is a high concentration of Costa Rican immigrants like New Jersey, Costa Ricans will gather and engage in social activities, e.g. at Costa Rican institutions like the Restaurante Puerto Viejo. "The Caribbean coastal regions are low-lying and heavily forested, while a chain of mountains parallels the Pacific coast."

Language 
A feature common to spoken Spanish in Costa Rica and other regions of Latin America is the voseo or ustedeo basic difference in Costa Rican Spanish. Younger generations of Costa Rican Americans are no longer using it as frequently in their spoken Spanish, likely due to intermingling with other Spanish-speaking immigrants from regions where the utilization of the voseo does not occur.

Demographics

List of Costa Rican American communities 
These are lists that indicated the largest populations of Costa Rican Americans according to states, residence areas and percentages.

States 
The ten states with the largest population of Costa Ricans (Source: 2010 Census):
 California - 22,469
 Florida - 20,761
 New Jersey - 19,993
 New York - 11,576
 Texas - 6,982
 North Carolina - 4,658
 Georgia - 3,114
 Pennsylvania - 3,048
 Massachusetts - 2,951
 Connecticut - 2,767

Areas 

The largest population of Costa Ricans are situated in the following areas (Source: Census 2010):
 New York-Northern New Jersey-Long Island, NY-NJ-PA MSA - 27,394
 Miami-Fort Lauderdale-Pompano Beach, FL MSA - 11,528
 Los Angeles-Long Beach-Santa Ana, CA MSA - 11,371
 Washington-Arlington-Alexandria, DC-VA-MD-WV MSA - 3,207
 Riverside-San Bernardino-Ontario, CA MSA - 3,125
 Houston-Sugar Land-Baytown, TX MSA - 2,717
 Philadelphia-Camden-Wilmington, PA-NJ-DE-MD MSA - 2,617
 Atlanta-Sandy Springs-Marietta, GA MSA - 2,433
 Tampa-St. Petersburg-Clearwater, FL MSA - 2,372
 Boston-Cambridge-Quincy, MA-NH MSA - 2,330
 San Francisco-Oakland-Fremont, CA MSA - 2,321
 Dallas-Fort Worth-Arlington, TX MSA - 2,296
 Orlando-Kissimmee-Sanford, FL MSA - 2,292
 Bridgeport-Stamford-Norwalk, CT MSA - 2,025
 Trenton-Princeton, NJ MSA - 1,801
 San Diego-Carlsbad-San Marcos, CA MSA - 1,749
 Chicago-Joliet-Naperville, IL-IN-WI MSA - 1,618
 Charlotte-Gastonia-Rock Hill, NC-SC MSA - 1,263
 Phoenix-Mesa-Glendale, AZ MSA - 1,200
 Las Vegas-Paradise, NV MSA - 1,027

U.S. communities with largest population of people of Costa Rican ancestry 

The top 25 U.S. communities with the highest populations of Costa Ricans (Source: Census 2010):
 New York, NY - 6,673
 Los Angeles - 3,182
 Trenton, NJ - 1,279
 Paterson, NJ - 1,241
 Bound Brook, NJ - 1,229
 Miami, FL - 1,197
 Norwalk, CT - 1,024
 Summit, NJ - 990
 Houston, TX - 923
 Philadelphia, PA - 903
 San Diego, CA - 723
 Chicago, IL - 681
 Charlotte, NC - 673
 Elizabeth, NJ - 660
 Boston, MA - 652
 Somerville, NJ - 627
 Manville, NJ - 576
 Jacksonville, FL - 542
 San Francisco, CA - 487
 Bridgeport, CT - 478
 Hialeah, FL - 476
 Long Beach, CA - 467
 Dallas, TX - 462
 Newark, NJ - 444
 Lincolnton, NC - 431

U.S. communities with high percentages of people of Costa Rican ancestry 

The top 25 U.S. communities with the highest percentages of Costa Ricans as a percent of total population (Source: Census 2010):
 Bound Brook, NJ - 11.82%
 Finderne, NJ - 6.43%
 Manville, NJ - 5.57%
 Somerville, NJ - 5.18%
 Summit, NJ - 4.61%
 Raritan, NJ - 4.16%
 Lincolnton, NC - 4.11%
 South Bound Brook, NJ - 3.09%
 Hampton Bays, NY - 2.98%
 Victory Gardens, NJ - 2.50%
 Clinton, NJ - 2.21%
 Delaware, NJ - 2.00%
 Belle Mead, NJ - 1.85%
 New Providence, NJ - 1.79%
 Dover, NJ - 1.73%
 Tuckahoe (Suffolk County), NY - 1.68%
 Prospect Park, NJ - 1.60%
 Flemington, NJ - 1.53%
 Trenton, NJ - 1.51%
 Maiden, NC - 1.39%
 Weston, NJ - 1.21%
 Westwood, NJ - 1.21%
 Norwalk, CT - 1.20%
 Bridgehampton, NY - 1.20%
 Lake Como, NJ - 1.19%

Notable people

 Akinyele - rapper
 Ralph Alvarado - physician and politician
 Govind Armstrong - chef who specializes in California cuisine
 Jean Brooks - actress 
 Danny Burstein - actor of theater, film and television
 Devin Star Tailes - singer and model 
 JP Calderon - volleyball player, model and reality show personality
 Ringo Cantillo - soccer player
 Franklin Chang Diaz - NASA astronaut
 Sonia Chang-Díaz - politician
 Sandro Corsaro - graphic designer and cartoonist; creator of Kick Buttowski: Suburban Daredevil
 Ricardo Delgado - film and comic book artist
 Christiana Figueres - head of the Paris negotiations on environmental issues
 Ricky Garbanzo - soccer player
 Heather Hemmens - actress, film director and producer; born to a Costa Rican mother
 Tomas Hilliard-Arce - professional soccer player
 Eliot A. Jardines - intelligence officer
 S.J. Main Muñoz - director, writer, producer
 Joseph Marquez - Smash Bros world champion
 Rosa Mendes - professional wrestler
 Candice Michelle - professional wrestler, model, actress
 Deroy Murdock - political commentator and editor
 J. Paul Raines - CEO of Gamestop
 Alexander Salazar - prelate
 Harry Shum, Jr. - dancer, actor
 Madeleine Stowe - actress
 Samuel I. Stupp - chemist

See also

Americans in Costa Rica
Costa Ricans
Costa Rica–United States relations

References

Further reading
 Chase, Cida S. "Costa Rican Americans." Gale Encyclopedia of Multicultural America, edited by Thomas Riggs, (3rd ed., vol. 1, Gale, 2014), pp. 543–551. online

 
 
Hispanic and Latino American